(Sacred choral music) is a collection of motets on German texts for choir by Heinrich Schütz. It was printed in Dresden in 1648 as his  (Op. 11), and comprises 29 individual settings for five to seven voices, which were assigned numbers 369 to 397 in the Schütz-Werke-Verzeichnis (SWV). It is also known as Geistliche Chor-Music 1648. The collection contains earlier and new works and a German arrangement of a motet by Andrea Gabrieli.

History 

Schütz assembled a collection of 29 motets, which were assigned numbers 369 to 397 in the SWV, in 1648, the year that ended the Thirty Years' War. The collection contains earlier and new works and a German arrangement of a motet by Andrea Gabrieli.

In an extended foreword, Schütz describes the work as examples of composition in counterpoint without basso continuo, following the model of his teacher Giovanni Gabrieli in stile antico, writing: Geistliche Chor-Music / Mit 5. 6. und 7. Stimmen / beydes Vocaliter und Instrumentaliter zugebrauchen / Auffgesetzet / Durch / Heinrich Schützen / ... Worbey der Bassus Generalis auff Gutachten und Begehren / nicht aber aus Nothwendigkeit / zugleich auch zu befinden ist ... (sacred choir music / with 5 6 and 7 voices / to be used both vocally and instrumentally / set / by / Heinrich Schützen / ... the general bass can be used at the same time if liked and wanted / but is not necessary).

Schütz dedicated the collection to Leipzig, addressing the mayor and the town council and mentioning especially the choir, known now as the Thomanerchor. The dedication, dated "Dreßden, am 21. April 1648", is his first not to court and nobility.

Collection 

Schütz set mostly biblical texts, but also a few hymns. It contains "pleas for peace" such as "Verleih uns Frieden genädiglich" (Bestow peace upon us mercifully), which "react to the events of the day with more or less timeless, traditional texts". The first twelve motets are settings for five parts, the others for six or seven parts.

Translations are provided by Emmanuel Music, while the column "Source" offers the text of the King James Version of the Bible.

Publication and recording 

Geistliche Chormusik was first published in Dresden by Johann Klemm. It was published by Breitkopf & Härtel as part of the first complete publication of the composer's works, edited by Philipp Spitta,  begun in 1885. It was published by Bärenreiter as part of the new critical edition Neue Schütz-Ausgabe. The five-part motets (No. 1–12) appeared in 2003, the others in 2006. The collection is part of the complete edition of the composer's works by Carus-Verlag, begun in 1992 as the Stuttgart Schütz Edition and planned to be completed by 2017. They were recorded, as part of the complete recordings of works by Schütz, in 2008 by the Dresdner Kammerchor and the Cappella Sagittariana, conducted by Hans-Christoph Rademann.

The motets have been frequently recorded individually or in selections. As of 2014, nine complete recordings were performed, making it the most frequently recorded of the collections by Schütz. Rudolf Mauersberger conducted the Dresdner Kreuzchor in 1962–63. Heinz Hennig conducted in 1981 to 1984 the Knabenchor Hannover with instruments, performing some motets with solo voices, others chorally, some with alternatives. Gerhard Schmidt-Gaden led a recording with the Tölzer Knabenchor in 1998, followed by Martin Behrmann, Manfred Cordes, Wilhelm Ehmann, Matteo Messori, Craig Smith and Masaaki Suzuki, Hans-Christoph Rademann among others.

References

External links 

 
 Heinrich Schütz: "Geistliche Chormusik" 1648 - alle Motetten Thüringer Komponisten und Bearbeiter 
 Im Dienst des Wortes / Heinrich Schütz: Motetten aus der "Geistlichen Chormusik" op. 11 Südwestrundfunk 

Compositions by Heinrich Schütz
Choral compositions
1648 books